In Islamic context, Ghafara (غفر) (v. past tense) or maghfira (forgiveness) is one of three ways of forgiveness, as written in the Qur'an and one of Allah's characteristics. It is to forgive, to cover up (sins) and to remit (absolution).

External links 
The Concept of Forgiveness in Islam
Islamic ethics
Islamic terminology